Arababad (also Romanized as ‘Arabābād; also known as ‘Arbābābād) is a village in Qasemabad Rural District, in the Central District of Rafsanjan County, Kerman Province, Iran. At the 2006 census, its population was 953, in 234 families.

References 

Populated places in Rafsanjan County